Mareil-en-Champagne is a commune in the Sarthe department in the region of Pays de la Loire in north-western France.

Geography
The river Vègre forms part of the commune's north-eastern border, flows southwestward through the commune, then forms most of its south-western border.

See also
Communes of the Sarthe department

References

Communes of Sarthe